FabricLive.56 is a 2011 DJ mix album by David Kennedy using his two monikers, Pearson Sound and Ramadanman. The album was released as part of the FabricLive Mix Series. It was released on 21 March 2011.

Track listing
  Pearson Sound - Hawker - Unreleased
  Levon Vincent - Late Night Jam - Ostgut Ton
  Elgato - Music (Body Mix) - Hessle Audio
  Marcello Napoletano - Everyday Madness - Rush Hour
  Tiyiselani Vomaseve - Vanghoma - Honest Jon's
  Pearson Sound - Wad (Bonus Beats) - Hessle Audio
  Julio Bashmore - Battle for Middle You - PMR
  Ramadanman - Grab Somebody - white label
  Appleblim & Ramadanman - Void 23 (Carl Craig Re-edit) - Aus
  Pearson Sound - Project - Unreleased
  Joy Orbison - GR Etiquette (Pearson Sound Symphonic Mix) - Doldrums
  J:Kenzo - Ruckas (Rob Kemp Remix) - Roska Kicks & Snares
  Fugative - Bad Girl (Lil Silva Dub) - Ministry of Sound
  A Made Up Sound - Demons - A Made Up Sound
  Jam City - Night Mode - Night Slugs
  Mr Mageeka - Different Lekstrix - Numbers
  Pangaea - Inna Daze - Hessle Audio
  Pearson Sound - Stifle - Hessle Audio
  MJ Cole & Wiley - From The Drop - Prolific
  Pinch - Qawwali - Planet Mu
  Ramadanman x Joy Orbison - J. Doe Them - Swamp81 / Doldrums
  Pearson Sound - Picon - Unreleased
  Burial - Pirates - Hyperdub
  Die Barbie Musik Kollektiv - Face [Junk] - Unreleased
  Girl Unit - IRL (Original / Bok Bok Remix) - Night Slugs
  D1 - Subzero - Submerged
  2 tracks mixed:
  S-X - Woooo - S-X Beats
  Ramadanman - Glut - Hemlock
  Addison Groove - Fuk Tha 101 - Hessle Audio
  2 tracks mixed:
  Mala (Digital Mystikz) - City Cycle - Tectonic
  Joe - Claptrap (Tease) - Hessle Audio
  Sigha - Light Swells (In A Distant Space) - Hotflush

References

External links
Fabric: FabricLive.56

2011 compilation albums
Albums produced by Jam City
Fabric (club) albums